The 2019 Sefton Metropolitan Borough Council election took place on 2 May 2019 to elect members of Sefton Metropolitan Borough Council in England. It was held on the same day as other local elections.

Ward results

Ainsdale

Birkdale

Blundellsands

Cambridge

Church

Derby

Dukes

Ford

Harington

Kew

Linacre

Litherland

Manor

Meols

Molyneux

Netherton & Orrell

Norwood

Park

Ravenmeols

St Oswald

Sudell

Victoria

References

2019 English local elections
2019
2010s in Merseyside
May 2019 events in the United Kingdom